The year 1895 in architecture involved some significant events.

Events
 William Alexander Harvey, aged 20, is appointed architect for the newly laid-out model village of Bournville in Birmingham, England.

Buildings and structures

Buildings

 Kaiser Wilhelm Memorial Church (Kaiser-Wilhelm-Gedächtniskirche), Berlin, Germany, by Franz Heinrich Schwechten, is consecrated.
 Holy Innocents Church, South Norwood, London, designed by George Frederick Bodley, is completed.
 Milwaukee City Hall in Milwaukee, Wisconsin, United States is completed, giving it the title of tallest building in the world until 1899.
 Biltmore House on Biltmore Estate in Asheville, North Carolina, United States, by Richard Morris Hunt is opened.
 Refuge Assurance Building in Manchester, England, by Alfred Waterhouse, is opened.
 Bishopsgate Institute in London, England, by Charles Harrison Townsend, is opened.
 New offices for The Glasgow Herald (now The Lighthouse) in Scotland, designed by John Keppie and worked on by Charles Rennie Mackintosh.
 Pera Palace Hotel in Constantinople.
D.T. Porter Building, the first steel frame skyscraper in Memphis, Tennessee, is completed. Designed by E.C. Jones.

Awards
 RIBA Royal Gold Medal – James Brooks.
 Grand Prix de Rome, architecture: René Patouillard-Demoriane.

Births
 July 12 – Richard Buckminster Fuller, American architect (died 1983)
 September 28 – Wallace Harrison, American architect (died 1981)
 December 17 – Wells Coates, Japanese-born Canadian architect working in England (died 1958)

Deaths
 April 23 – Francis Thompson, English architect working chiefly on railways (born 1808)
 June 23 – James Renwick, Jr., American architect (born 1818)

References